The Bad Man is a 1941 American Western film starring Wallace Beery and featuring Lionel Barrymore, Laraine Day, and Ronald Reagan. The movie was written by Wells Root from the 1920 Porter Emerson Browne play of the same name, and directed by Richard Thorpe. The film is a remake of the 1923 silent version and the 1930 remake starring Walter Huston.  The 1941 supporting cast includes Tom Conway and Chill Wills.

Plot
Gil Jones is happy to find Lucia, his childhood love, when she unexpectedly arrives at his ranch in Mexico, but he learns that she is now married to Morgan Pell, a businessman from New York. That same afternoon, the famous bandit Pancho Lopez steals cattle from the ranch and injures Gil. Henry, Gil's uncle, is angry that the robbery is ruining them. In the evening, Morgan tells Lucia that he fears that she still loves Gil, but she promises to always stay with him.

A month later, when the banker Hardy wants to take over the ranch, Morgan returns from the city and offers $20,000 for the apparently worthless ranch. Uncle Henry manages to convince the two men that there may be petroleum under his land. Lopez arrives and takes everyone hostage except Gil, who is in the barn.

Cast

 Wallace Beery as Pancho Lopez
 Lionel Barrymore as Uncle Henry Jones
 Laraine Day as Lucia Pell
 Ronald Reagan as Gil Jones
 Henry Travers as Jasper Hardy
 Chris-Pin Martin as Pedro
 Tom Conway as Morgan Pell
 Chill Wills as Red Giddings
 Nydia Westman as Angela Hardy
 Charles Stevens as Venustiano

See also
 Lionel Barrymore on stage, screen and radio
 Ronald Reagan filmography
 List of American films of 1941

References

External links

 
 
 Poster for film at impawards.com

1941 films
1940s English-language films
1941 Western (genre) films
American black-and-white films
Films directed by Richard Thorpe
Metro-Goldwyn-Mayer films
American Western (genre) films
Films scored by Franz Waxman
1940s American films